H. Joseph Allen (born July 19, 1941 in The Bronx, New York) is an American businessman and Thoroughbred racehorse owner and breeder.

Biography
A graduate of the University of Michigan, Allen is a partner with his cousin Peter M. Brant in the privately owned newsprint company, Brant-Allen Industries, Inc, co-founded by their fathers. Allen served as vice chairman and president of the company.

For a number of years Joseph Allen has been involved in Thoroughbred racing and with Peter Brant, owned Just A Game, winner of the 1980 Eclipse Award for American Champion Female Turf Horse. The Grade 1 Just A Game Stakes at Belmont Park is run in her honor.

At the age of 29, Allen married 19 year old Barbara Tanner, in the early 1970s. He bought her a 25 percent stake of Andy Warhol's Interview magazine, so she would have something to do.  Fran Liebowitz, who was then an associate of Warhol, said the marriage was over as soon as Barbara joined the Warhol entourage. He later married and divorced Rhonda Roland Shearer.

References

External links
 Profile - National Thoroughbred Racing Association

1941 births
Living people
University of Michigan alumni
American racehorse owners and breeders
People from the Bronx
20th-century American businesspeople